Perevoz is a town and the administrative center of Perevozsky District in Nizhny Novgorod Oblast, Russia, located on the Pyana River,  southeast of Nizhny Novgorod, the administrative center of the oblast. Population:

History
Town status was granted to Perevoz in 2001.

Administrative and municipal status
Within the framework of administrative divisions, Perevoz serves as the administrative center of Perevozsky District. As an administrative division, it is, together with the village of Chergat, incorporated within Perevozsky District as the town of district significance of Perevoz. As a municipal division, the town of district significance of Perevoz is incorporated within Perevozsky Municipal District as Perevoz Urban Settlement.

Notable residents 

Gennady Yanayev (1937–2010), Soviet politician

References

Notes

Sources

Cities and towns in Nizhny Novgorod Oblast